Corps of Signals may refer to:-

 Indian Army Corps of Signals
 Pakistan Army Corps of Signals
 Royal Corps of Signals in the British Army